La Redención is a Paraguayan road movie and historical drama partially set in the Chaco War. This is the second film of director Hérib Godoy after Latas vacías (2014).

Plot 
Using a nonlinear narrative, the film depicts the 1991 meeting between José Villalba, a terminally ill Chaco War veteran and the young Marlene, the granddaughter of a former brother-in-arms. They undertake a journey in search of the whereabouts of Marlene's grandfather through different villages and locations across the Paraguayan countryside. Intermingled with flashbacks of a young Villalba and his companions in the trenches of Nanawa in July 1933, Marlene and José uncover long-time forgotten stories and unearth the past to eventually come to terms with their own lives.

Production 
Néstor Amarilla Ojeda wrote the screenplay, while Aline Moscato was in charge of the production.

The film fanpage was available since January 2017.

The movie was shot at Coronel Oviedo and several locations in Caaguazú department during January 2017.

The first backstage was released on 18 February 2018 and uploaded to the movie's website. The first teaser dates back to June 2017. while the trailer was made public on 12 April 2018, and hit more than 100,000 views on social networks.

Godoy had already filmed another historic drama about the Chaco War in 2006, with the short film Guerra re.

Reception
La Redención was released internationally on the 13th Latin-American Film Festival of São Paulo in the section "Contemporáneos". Brazilian online magazine Adoro Cinema made an extense review of the film.

The movie was also invited to the 14th Latin American Film Festival at Melbourne.

Cast 
Main roles: Juan Carlos Notari, Lali González.

1991 cast: Ramón Del Río, Emilio Barreto, Miriam Notari, Lucas Godoy, Silvia Villalba, Carlos Balmoriz, Víctor Mujica, Marlene Quiñonez, Gladys Ramírez, Máximo Florentín, Marcos Varela, Álvaro Benítez, Miguel González.

1933 cast: José Barrios, Aníbal Ortiz, Blas Filártiga, Mauro Acosta, Sergio Cardozo, Fidel Fariña, Estanislao Brítez, Juan Ubaldo Godoy, Rolando Sanabria.

Soundtrack 

Un pelotón de humanidad

Purahei Soul
Author: Néstor Amarilla Ojeda
Arrangements: Purahei Soul
Violin: Juanchi Alvarez
Harp: Juanjo Corbalan
Guitar: Miguel Narvaez
Vocals: Edu Benitez
Miguel Narvaez
Jennifer Hicks

Voy gritando

Luis Alberto del Paraná y Los Paraguayos
Author: Luis Alberto del Paraná
Label: Bluecaps

Mi guitarra y mi voz

Luis Alberto del Paraná y Los Paraguayos
Author: Luis Alberto del Paraná and Julio Jara
Label: Bluecaps

13 Tuyutí

Intérprete: Juan Carlos Oviedo y los Hermanos Acuña
Letra: Emiliano R. Fernández
Música: Ramón Vargas Colmán
Label: The Song

References

Online references 

‘La Redención’, un viaje a medias

2010s Spanish-language films
Guaraní-language films
Paraguayan drama films
Chaco War films
2010s road movies
2018 multilingual films